Aristocrat Leisure Limited is an Australian gambling machine manufacturer, which has its administrative and research headquarters in the Sydney suburb of North Ryde. It has marketing and development offices in South Africa, Russia, and the United States.

Aristocrat is the largest gambling machine manufacturer in Australia, and one of the largest manufacturers of slot machines in the world, currently second only to International Game Technology.

History
The company produced its first machine in 1953 and was listed on the Australian Stock Exchange in 1996. The company was founded by Len Ainsworth, whose family maintains a substantial stake in the company, but is now chairman of a different gaming company, Ainsworth Game Technology. Aristocrat is licensed to distribute slot machines and other gaming products in over 200 jurisdictions (note that many countries, such as Australia, have a number of different gaming-license jurisdictions).

Aristocrat's CEO blamed the US subprime mortgage crisis for poor financial results in 2008, despite the fact that competing companies have experienced record growth in the same time period. As a result of the expected drop in revenue, the CEO enacted sweeping budget cuts, including large-scale retrenchments of staff from all areas of the business. The company again faced difficult market conditions in 2009 with its full-year resulting in a net loss of $157.8 million. 

In 2011, the company reached an agreement with the AGLC to provide equipment and games for Alberta's video lottery terminal network.

In July 2014 Aristocrat agreed to buy Video Gaming Technologies for about $1.3 billion to triple its North American business amid falling profit in Australia. On 10 August 2017, it acquired mobile game developer Plarium for $500 million to enter into mobile gaming. On 30 November 2017, it acquired mobile game developer Big Fish Games for US$990 million.

Since March 2017, the CEO has been Trevor Croker, formerly executive vice president for global products, who succeeded Jamie Odell.

In July 2019, Aristocrat sued Ainsworth, alleging that they had used proprietary code and media assets leaked by a former Aristocrat employee to produce a clone of its popular Lightning Link games.

On October 4th, 2021, Aristocrat gaming was awarded the “Land-based Product”, “Land-based industry supplier” and “Slot of the year" (“Buffalo Link”) from the Global Gaming Awards in Las Vegas for the “in the clear” initiative introduced for their gaming machines. 

On 18 October 2021, Aristocrat announced they will bid to buy Playtech for US$3.7 billion, which was later turned down by Playtech shareholders with more than 45% voting against the deal. However, the company stated it will consider other proposals. As a result of this, in May 2022, Aristocrat announced it will launch its online casino business by the end of 2022, as the group aims to become as a leader in the emerging digital gambling industry. Additionally, Aristocrat announced a $500 million on-market share buyback to return some of the $1.3 additional funding raised for the failed bid of Playtech.

Products and partnerships
Aside from spinning reel slot machines, the company has interests in gambling systems (computerized network systems that manage slot machines), computerized card game simulations, electronic table games, and linked jackpot systems (such as the patented Hyperlink systems). The company has developed the Reel Power system, where players buy reels instead of lines, winning combinations in the standard configuration.

Aristocrat's most prominent products have been game setups that place large progressive jackpots over a number of machines, including its Lightning Link series. The series has seen substantial popularity, to the point that Aristocrat has licensed branded areas at several North American casinos dedicated exclusively to the machines.

The company has a number of distribution partnerships, including Sammy Corporation in Japan.

In the U.S., Aristocrat has licensed titles to Grand Vision Gaming of Montana for use on video lottery terminals.

In 2022 the company has entered into an agreement with the New England Patriots becoming the Official Betting partner of the team. As part of the contract, the  Patriot’s Gillette Stadium was also branded with Aristocrat Gaming signage. The company is expected to release NFL-themed games in the fall of 2023. The game will include all the teams in the National Football League and allow players to pick up and play with their favourite team.

References

External links

 

Gambling companies of Australia
Slot machine manufacturers
Manufacturing companies based in Sydney
Manufacturing companies established in 1953
Australian brands
Companies listed on the Australian Securities Exchange
Australian companies established in 1953